Indian Institute of Information Technology Tiruchirappalli (IIITT) is a higher education academic and research institute located in Tiruchirappalli, Tamil Nadu, India. It is one of the Indian Institutes of Information Technology (IIITs) established under the non-profit Public-Private Partnership and is an funded by the Government of India, Government of Tamil Nadu and the Indian industry partners in the ratio of 50:35:15. Industry partners include Tata Consultancy Services (TCS), Cognizant Technology Solutions (CTS), Infosys, Ramco Systems, ELCOT, and Navitas (Take Solutions). Together with the other IIITs, it has been granted the status of Institute of National importance in 2017.

Campus

Temporary campus
IIIT Tiruchirappalli started functioning in 2013 in the premises of Bharathidasan Institute of Technology (BIT) Campus but it was shifted to National Institute of Technology, Tiruchirappalli (NITT) in 2016. The NITT resources such as Boys and Girls Hostels, Messes, Central Library, Sports Facilities, Swimming Pool, Hospital, Bank, Post Office, Canteen, Class rooms, Laboratories and Central Computing facilities are being shared with IIITT. Until June 2019, under the support of mentor director Dr. Mini Shaji Thomas, IIITT has been functioning at its peak by collaborating with NITT in terms of facilities being provided and participation in technical and cultural events hosted by NITT. In September 2019, IIITT shifted the hostel and sports amenities to K. Ramakrishna College of Engineering. On July 1, 2020, IIITT shifted its temporary campus to Oxford Engineering College (Dindugal - Pirattiyur highway). As of July 2021 IIITT is functioning completely from the permanent campus of IIIT Tiruchirappalli, Sethurapatti. IIITT has its own placement cell since 2017 and has been assisting students in obtaining placement offers from companies like TCS, Infosys, Modelon and few startups.

Permanent campus
The permanent campus of IIITT is established approximately in 62 acres of land identified in Sethurappatti, Srirangam Taluk, Tiruchirappalli which is 15 km away from Tiruchirappalli Junction and 10 km from Viralimalai Town, Pudukkottai District along the highway of Tiruchirappalli to Madurai. The campus is fully functioning through its permanent campus.

Academics

Academic programs

Undergraduate Courses 

1. Computer Science and Engineering (4 year, Bachelor of Technology)
2. Electronics and Communication Engineering

Postgraduate Courses 
1. Computer Science and Engineering (2 years, Masters of Technology)
2. VLSI Systems (2 years, Masters of Technology)

Doctoral Program

Computer Science and Engineering 
Data Analytics, Machine Learning, Deep Learning, IoT, Cloud Computing, Medical Image Processing and allied areas

Electronics and Communication Engineering 
VLSI Design, Wireless Communication, Micro & Nano Electronics, Compact Modeling & Simulation and allied areas

Mechanical Engineering 
Additive Manufacturing, Powder Metallurgy, Smart Materials, Energy storage materials

Science and Humanities

Physics 
Optoelectronic Materials & Devices, Fiber optics, Plasmonics, Semiconductor heterostructures

Mathematics 
Fluid Dynamics

Economics 
Health Economics, Health Technology Assessment, Global issues in health and development

English 
Applied Linguistics, Indian Writing in English

Admission
The admission to B.Tech programs is done through JEE-Mains and the JEE-Mains qualified candidates are admitted to UG program through Centralized Seat Allocation Board (CSAB) and Joint Seat Allocation Authority (JoSAA) following the reservation policy of Govt. of India.

Student life

Clubs
Feliz CLUB
The club is a student club of volunteers formed to identify the needs of socially weaker sections such as old age homes, orphanages, etc. and to extend a helping hand to their requirements. The Feliz club was formally inaugurated on 07, April 2017.

Festivals

Institute Day
The Institute Day is celebrated on 07, April. On this day Meritorious students are awarded Certificates and Medals. Various cultural activities were performed by the students which include Indian Classical Dance, Solo Dance, Mono Act, Group Dance.

See also
 National Institute of Technology, Tiruchirappalli
 List of universities in India
 Universities and colleges in India
 Education in India

References

Engineering colleges in Tamil Nadu
Tiruchirappalli
Universities and colleges in Tiruchirappalli
Educational institutions established in 2013
2013 establishments in Tamil Nadu